Personal aircraft may refer to:

General aviation, which includes privately owned aircraft for personal use
Personal air vehicle, a proposed on-demand air taxi class of service